Mānana Island is an uninhabited islet located  off Kaupō Beach, near Makapuu at the eastern end of the island of Oahu in the Hawaiian Islands. In the Hawaiian language, mānana means "buoyant". The islet is commonly referred to as Rabbit Island, because its shape as seen from the nearby Oahu shore looks something like a rabbit's head and because it was once inhabited by introduced rabbits. The rabbit colony was established by John Adams Cummins in the 1880s when he ran the nearby Waimānalo plantation.
The rabbits were eradicated about a hundred years later because they were destroying the native ecosystem, an important seabird breeding area.

Mānana is a tuff cone with two vents or craters. Mānana's only sand beach is a small storm beach on the west to south-west (leeward) side of the islet. Another volcanic islet named Kāohikaipu sits right next to Mānana.

Manana was formed by the Honolulu Volcanic Series. These series of eruptions were responsible for creating other tuff cones such as Punchbowl Crater.

Mānana is a State Seabird Sanctuary—home to over 10,000 wedge-tailed shearwaters, 80,000 sooty terns, 20,000 brown noddys, 5–10 Bulwer's petrels, and 10–15 red-tailed tropicbirds, and numerous Hawaiian monk seals. It is illegal to land on the islet without permission from the Hawaii Department of Land and Natural Resources.

References

External links 
 

Islands of Hawaii
Geography of Honolulu County, Hawaii
Volcanoes of Oahu
Hotspot volcanoes
Tuff cones
Quaternary volcanoes
Quaternary Oceania